Vivek Express is a chain of express trains on the Indian Railways network. These trains were announced in the Railway Budget of 2011-12 by the then Railway Minister. These trains were started to commemorate the 150th birth anniversary of Swami Vivekananda, to be held in 2013.

List of Vivek Express Trains
As of July 2013, there are 4 pairs of Vivek Express trains

Dibrugarh - Kanyakumari Vivek Express

This Biweekly train, numbered 15905/15906, is currently the longest train route in the Indian Subcontinent. It joins Dibrugarh in Assam, North-East India to Kanyakumari, Tamil Nadu which is the southernmost tip of Indian mainland. It covers a total of 4234 km from Dibrugarh to Kanyakumari. It takes 79 hours to cover this distance with 57 intermediate stoppages.

Okha - Tuticorin Vivek Express

This too, is a weekly train, numbered 19567/19568. It connects Okha, Gujarat (which is the westernmost tip of India) to Thoothukudi, the "Pearl City", in Tamil Nadu in South India. This train covers 3043 km in 54:25 hours. It travels through the states of Gujarat, Maharashtra, Andhra Pradesh, Karnataka and Tamil Nadu.

This train is also religiously important, as it joins two places of religious significance, namely Lord Krishna's Dwarka and Rameswaram, which lies close to Thoothukudi.

The train covers important cities en route, namely Rajkot, Ahmedabad, Vadodara, Surat, Mumbai Vasai Road, Kalyan, Pune, Gulbarga, Adoni, Bangalore (Krishnarajapuram), Salem, Karur and Madurai.

Bandra Terminus Jammu Tawi Vivek Express

This train seeks its origin from Bandra Terminus, one of the main stations in Mumbai. This train, 19027/19028, like other Vivek Expresses, is also a weekly train from Bandra Terminus, Mumbai to Jammu Tawi in North India. However, unlike other typical North Indian trains, this train bypasses New Delhi or Delhi NCR. It goes via Surat, Vadodara, Ahmedabad, Mehsana, Abu Road, Jodhpur, Degana, Sujangarh, Churu, Sadulpur, Hisar, Ludhiana, Jalandhar and Chakki Bank, thus bypassing Delhi NCR.

Santragachi - Mangalore Central Vivek Express

The 22851/22852 Vivek Express links Santragachhi, a town in the vicinity of Howrah, Kolkata in West Bengal to Mangalore Central in Karnataka. This is also a weekly train, which comes under the Superfast category of the Indian Railways, unlike other Vivek Expresses. This train passes through the states of West Bengal, Odisha, Andhra Pradesh, Tamil Nadu, Kerala and Karnataka. Important cities en route are Bhubaneswar, Brahmapur, Vizianagaram, Visakhapatnam, Rajahmundry, Eluru, Vijayawada, Tirupati, salem, Tiruppur Coimbatore, Palakkad, Tirur, Kozhikode, Kannur and Kasaragod

Route maps

Future plans
Owing to the positive response to Vivek Express trains by the masses, the Railway Ministry is considering starting a new Vivek Express in the North to East Corridor, between Jammu Tawi and North East India. Earlier Vivek Express trains ran from East to South, South to West, West to North and again East to South India respectively. The new North to East Vivek Express would complete the quadrilateral.

See also

 Himsagar Express
 Tamil Nadu Express
 Video of Vivek Express
 Longest Train ride in India

References

Rail transport in Assam